Ruszowice may refer to the following places in Poland:
Ruszowice, Głogów County in Gmina Głogów, Głogów County in Lower Silesian Voivodeship (SW Poland)
Ruszowice, Kłodzko County in Gmina Kłodzko, Kłodzko County in Lower Silesian Voivodeship (SW Poland)